is designated as a Class A river by the Japanese government with a length of 9.7 km and a basin area of 21.4 km².

Course
It starts in the Myō-ji Temple pond in Suginami Ward, and joins the Egotagawa later on. It flows into the Kanda River (Takadanobaba Channel) in Shinjuku Ward.

Recent history
Due to the progress of urbanization, the water retention capacity of the Myōshōji River has fallen and there is an increasing risk of water damage. To cope with this situation, the Tokyo Metropolitan Government has constructed revetments that can handle rainfall of up to 50 millimeters per hour.

References 

 kensetsu.metro.tokyo.jp

External links
 kanda-gawa.com

Rivers of Tokyo
Rivers of Japan